Count Henry II of Holstein-Rendsburg (nickname Iron Henry;  – ) was count of Holstein-Rendsburg and pledge lord of Southern Schleswig.  He ruled jointly with his younger brother, Count Nicholas (d. 1397).

Life 
Henry was the elder son of Count Gerhard III and Sophia of Werle.  Henry was a major European player as a mercenary leader and a typical representative of the late medieval knighthood.  He fought in Italy, Russia, Estonia and France.  He served in the English and Swedish armies.  In 1367, he was commander of a fleet of the Hanseatic League and in 1368, he conquered Copenhagen.  Count Henry II and his brother Nicholas vigorously defended their claims in Holstein and Schleswig, against Denmark and against the Frisians.

Marriage and issue 
Henry was married twice:
 Matilda (d. 1365), the daughter of Bernard V, Lord of Lippe.  They had one daughter:
 Matilda (documented on March 12, 1365) 
 1366 Ingeborg (d. 25 Jul 1395), daughter of Albert II, Duke of Mecklenburg-Schwerin.  They had four children:
 Gerhard VI
 Albert II
 Henry III (d. 1421), Prince-Bishop of Osnabrück as Henry I
 Sophia of Holstein (born: 1375 in Lübeck), married Bogislaw VIII of Pomerania-Stargard

Seal
His seal had the inscription: S (IGILLUM) * HINRICI * D (E) I * GRA (TIA) * COMIT (IS) * HOLTZACIE * STORM ARIA
(Seal of Henry by the grace of God Duke of Holstein, (and) Stormarn)

References 
 
 Helge Bei der Wieden: Schaumburgische Genealogie, 2nd ed., Verlag Ernst Knoth, Melle, 1999; 
 Verein für Lübecksche Geschichte und Alterthumskunde: Siegel des Mittelalters aus den Archiven der Stadt Lübeck, Lübeck, 1862-1865

External links 
 Der Isern Hinrik -  A professional soldier in the late Middle Ages at kriegsreisende.de

Footnotes

Henry 02
Henry 02
House of Schauenburg
1310s births
1380s deaths
14th-century German nobility
Year of birth uncertain

Year of death uncertain